Sergio Pérez Pérez (b. Madrid, 23 July 1984) is a Spanish tennis player playing on the ATP Challenger Tour. He has won one Challenger title, in doubles.  He has played in one ATP World Tour main draw match, also in doubles.

On June 23, 2008, Pérez Pérez reached his highest ATP singles ranking of World No. 614, whilst his highest doubles ranking of 357 was reached on April 14, 2008. He is the younger brother of Spanish tennis player Luis Antonio Pérez Pérez.

Challenger finals

Doubles: 1 (1–0)

References

External links

1984 births
Living people
Spanish male tennis players
Tennis players from Madrid